is a Japanese actress.

Matsushita was born in Nayoro, Hokkaido and grew up in Nagoya, Aichi Prefecture. She is represented by Amuse, Inc. and later her personal office Jesus Collect Incorporated.

Filmography

Films

Television

Stage

References

1968 births
Living people
Actors from Hokkaido
People from Nagoya
20th-century Japanese actresses
21st-century Japanese actresses
People from Nayoro, Hokkaido